The Hop Poles is a Grade II listed public house at 17–19 King Street, Hammersmith, London.

It was built in 1857, the amalgamation of two earlier houses, and the architect is not known".

References

Pubs in the London Borough of Hammersmith and Fulham
Grade II listed buildings in the London Borough of Hammersmith and Fulham
Grade II listed pubs in London
Commercial buildings completed in 1857
Hammersmith
1857 establishments in England